Iraqi Council may refer to:

 Council of Representatives of Iraq, the unicameral legislature of Iraq
 Iraqi Governing Council, the provisional government of Iraq from July 13, 2003, to June 1, 2004
 Iraqi National Dialogue Council, a Sunni Islamist political party initially established as an umbrella organization of approximately ten smaller Sunni parties to take part in the 2005 Iraqi Constitution drafting process
 Revolutionary Command Council (Iraq), the ultimate decision-making body in Iraq before the 2003 Invasion of Iraq